1857 in archaeology

Events
 Shadwell forgeries first made.

Excavations
 Coldrum Long Barrow in south east England.

Finds
 First artifacts of La Tène culture at La Tène, Switzerland
 Battersea Shield in the River Thames

Publications
 William Wilde begins publication of a classified catalogue of the museum of the Royal Irish Academy.

Births
 3 June - Jacques de Morgan, French archaeologist (d. 1924)
 27 July - E. A. Wallis Budge, English Egyptologist (d. 1934)

Deaths

6 May - John Disney, English barrister and archaeologist (b. 1799)

See also
 List of years in archaeology
 1856 in archaeology
 1858 in archaeology

References

Archaeology
Archaeology by year
Archaeology
Archaeology